

External links 

Lists of 2017 term United States Supreme Court opinions